Urban Land Conservancy (ULC) is a Denver based nonprofit organization established in 2003, that acquires, develops and preserves real estate assets for long-term community benefits. ULC acquires properties such as schools, future and current transit hubs, commercial space, and property identified as having community benefit. ULC also develops unique financing tools to aid in their real estate acquisitions. 

In 2021, the group purchased the former Johnson and Wales University campus in South Park Hill, which quit enrolling students in June 2020. Part of the site is now being redeveloped by a private school, with the nonprofit small business Kitchen Network also leasing space. Denver Housing Authority and Archway Communities plan to convert six dorms into income-restricted housing.

History
Urban Land Conservancy was established in 2003 with capital from the Gary-Williams Energy Corporation through the Piton Foundation, a philanthropic organization founded by Sam Gary.

ULC's founding board members determined ULC would use community engagement to determine neighborhood needs and began with a focus on the acquisition and preservation of real estate for the long term availability of physical space for nonprofit and community organizations; addressing different types of housing needs; addressing educational needs for children and adults; ensuring convenient and affordable access to child care services.

Approach
ULC utilizes a variety of real estate practices to ensure long-term affordability throughout the Denver Metro area. Land banking, the practice of acquiring parcels of land for future development, is a practice ULC utilizes to make affordable housing feasible. ULC acquires property that is at risk of being lost to the market and holds the property for future development. ULC also employs a community land trust (CLT) model with a 99-year, renewable ground lease, to circumvent the expirations imposed by the City and Federal Low Income Housing Tax Credits (LIHTC) to bring about long-term affordability. When a development partner is identified, a 99-year ground lease is signed, with an automatic 99-year renewal for a total of 198 years. A ground lease ties the land owner to the user; thereby creating a tenant interest and a landlord interest. CLT's ensure that the land owner has a stake in any future use of the development.

Resources 
ULC utilizes a variety of resources to finance their real estate acquisitions. Since 2010, ULC has acted as the sole borrower of three loan facilities totaling nearly $40 million to date.

Denver Transit Oriented Development Fund (TOD) 
ULC, Enterprise Community Partners and the City and County of Denver partnered to establish the nation's first Transit Oriented Development Fund. The revolving loan fund makes capital available to acquire and hold land for the development or preservation of affordable housing for up to five years along current and proposed transit corridors.

The TOD Fund was created to develop and preserve 1,000 affordable homes along current and future transit corridors in Denver. Sites purchased through the Fund are within one-half mile of fixed-rail transit stations or one-quarter mile of high-frequency bus stops.

The Urban Land Conservancy, made the initial equity commitment of $1.5 million to the TOD Fund and leads real estate acquisition, management and disposition of assets to housing providers to meet the priorities of the Fund.

Calvert Facility Fund 
An investment fund started by Calvert Impact Capital. Under the name Ours to Own, the Calvert Impact Fund focuses on preserving real estate in urban centers for schools, community spaces, and affordable commercial space for nonprofits. $5.1 million was raised from hundreds of individual investors in the Denver region in the first two years of Ours to Own. In addition to small individual investments, the Fund received investment from the Piton Foundation, Gary Community Investments, Colorado Health Foundation, The Colorado Trust, and The Denver Foundation. In 2014, ULC partnered with Calvert Impact Capital to deploy $10 million of the low-interest source of capital fund towards the purchase of three real-estate assets that support over 20 nonprofit organizations.

Metro Denver Impact Facility (MDIF)    
A revolving loan capital established by Urban Land Conservancy with lending partners including: FirstBank, Colorado Health Foundation (CHF), The Denver Foundation (TDF) and the Colorado Housing and Finance Authority (CHFA). FirstBank committed $25 million to the Facility and CHF was the first lending partner, contributing $2 million. FirstBank's investment will act as Senior Debt, and the bank will manage MDIF locally, underwriting each deal and evaluating the need for additional project financing to address capital needs. ULC is the sole borrower of the Facility, responsible for creating the development plan and permanent financing structure. ULC will also manage the disposition of these properties and where feasible, retain ownership interest as part of a Community Land Trust (CLT) through a 99-year ground lease.

Low-Income Housing Tax Credit (LIHTC) 
A Federal dollar-for-dollar tax credit program. Introduced in 1986 to bolster affordable housing investments, it accounts for the vast majority of all rental housing in the United States (approximately 90%). Federal housing tax credits are awarded to developers for developments that meet certain criteria. Developers then sell these credits to investors to raise capital for their projects, in turn reducing the debt that the developer would otherwise have to borrow. Because the debt is lower, a tax credit property can in turn offer lower, more affordable rents. In Colorado, CHFA is the designated state allocating agency, charged with implementing LIHTC in Colorado.

Properties

Partnerships
ULC has partnerships with both national and local non-profits, for-profits and public organizations to advance their mission. ULC is a member/partner of the following organizations and coalitions:

Mile High Connects— a nonprofit that aims to increase access to housing, employment, schools and other services through public transit.
Citywide Banks— a Colorado-based community bank founded in 1963. As of 2014, Citywide has provided $12 million in loans to ULC for acquisition of real-estate assets with a social and community benefit.  
Colorado Health Foundation (CHF)— a nonprofit, private foundation focused on health access for all Coloradans by working with communities throughout Colorado. In 2018, CHF helped launched the $50 million Metro Denver Impact Facility, a revolving loan capital that will assist in the creation and preservation of affordable housing and community serving space in the Greater Denver area.   
Colorado Housing and Finance Authority (CHFA)— the state delegated agency for distributing LIHTC in Colorado.   
The Colorado Trust— a nonprofit foundation focused on community partnerships, health policy and advocacy, and equity.   
Denver Regional Housing Collaborative— a group of many Colorado affordable housing organizations working to provide advocacy and leadership for affordable housing.
The Denver Foundation— Colorado's oldest and largest community building foundation. The Denver Foundation works for individuals, families, and businesses to help achieve their goals and meet core challenges to the Metro Denver area. ULC is a supporting organization to The Denver Foundation.
Denver Livability Partnership— a partnership meant to expand affordable housing, increase access to employment and create better modes of transportation that connect Denver.
Community Development Partnership— a group of community developers, foundations and financial institutions who work together on housing and economic development opportunities in Denver.
Practitioners Leveraging Assets for Community Enhancement (PLACE)- a unified voice of housing and community development practitioners who build, preserve, and maintain adequate and affordable housing and promote community development for low and moderate income families across the country. Members are expert end-users of federal, state and private housing and community development funding, leveraging various sources of capital to build and strengthen America's communities.
Denver Regional Council of Governments (DRCOG) Sustainable Communities Initiative—a  consortium funded by a $4.5 million award from the U.S. Department of Housing and Urban Development that supports a regional plan for growth and development particularly in regard to FasTracks.
First Bank— a private banking institution based out of Lakewood, Colorado. First Bank was the initial lending partner for the Metro Denver Impact Facility (MDIF), committing $25 million in 2018 to MDIF, which will serve as a resource to support ULC's real-estate acquisitions.
Holly Area Redevelopment Project — In partnership with actively engaged neighbors, ULC, assisted by City of Denver's Office of Economic Development, Strengthening Neighborhoods (a program of The Denver Foundation) and Community by Design consultants, initiated the first phase of the Holly Area Redevelopment Project (HARP). This effort brought the community together to see the site once again serve as an anchor for the Northeast Park Hill area. A key component of the broadly supported plan was the establishment of “Good Neighbor Principles” which is guiding redevelopment plans for the Holly property.
Medici Consulting Group — a Denver-based community development firm. ULC and Medici have partnered on two developments, the Evans and Walnut Street Lofts, together bringing over 100 units of affordable transit-oriented development.
MidFirst Bank— a privately owned bank based in Oklahoma City, Oklahoma. MidFirst provided resources for predevelopment, acquisition and refinancing on six properties totaling over $6 million.
Neighborhood Development Collaborative (NDC) — a nonprofit community development corporation comprising 13 affordable housing and community development organizations.
Radian — an award-winning nonprofit architecture firm and urban design firm. ULC has partnered with Radian on several projects, most notably Colorado's first Tiny Home Village for individuals facing homelessness.
Westwood Unidos — a resident-led, neighborhood collaborative initiative to increase community health and livability in the Westwood neighborhood of Denver.

See also

Urban planning
Green development
Real estate development
Land-use planning
Property preservation
Transit-oriented development

References

Organizations based in Denver